Robert Edward Fraser Berry (1926-2011) was an Anglican bishop in the 20th century.

Berry was born in Ottawa on 21 January 1926 and educated at Sir George Williams College, McGill University and Montreal Diocesan Theological College.

He was ordained in 1953  and began his career as an Assistant Priest at Christ Church Cathedral, Victoria, BC. After this he held incumbencies at St Margaret's, Hamilton, Ontario, St Mark's, Orangeville, St Luke's, Winnipeg and St Michael and All Angels, Kelowna.

In 1971, he was elected as the 7th Bishop of Kootenay, a post he held until his retirement in 1989.

He died on 25 October 2011 in Kelowna, British Columbia.

References

People from Ottawa
1926 births
McGill University alumni
20th-century Anglican Church of Canada bishops
Anglican bishops of Kootenay
2011 deaths